Barbiers is the surname of a large family of artists. Notable people with the surname include:

Pieter Barbiers (I), (1717–1780) Dutch artist, father of Pieter Pietersz (II) and Bartholomeus (I) 
Pieter Pietersz Barbiers (II) (1749–1842), Dutch artist, son of Pieter (I)
Bartholomeus Barbiers II, (1784–1816) Dutch painter, son of Pieter Pietersz (II)
Bartholomeus Barbiers (I), (1743–1808) Dutch painter, son of Pieter (I)
Pieter Bartholomeusz Barbiers (III), (1771–1837) Dutch artist, son of Bartholomeus (I)
Maria Geertruida Barbiers-Snabilie (1776 – 1838) Dutch artist, wife of Pieter (III)
Pieter Barbiers IV, (1798–1848) Dutch artist, son of Pieter Bzsn (III) and Maria Geertruida Snabilié
Maria Geertruida Barbiers (1801–1849) Dutch artist, daughter of Pieter Bzsn (III) and Maria Geertruida Snabilié; sister of the former, who married the painter Pieter de Goeje (1789–1859)

Dutch engravers
18th-century Dutch painters
19th-century Dutch painters